Edward Elgar (1857–1934) was an English romantic composer.

Elgar may also refer to:

Surname
 Alice Elgar (1848–1920), English poet and author, wife of Edward Elgar
 Avril Elgar (born 1932), British actress
 Dean Elgar (born 1987), South African cricketer
 Ella Elgar (1869–1945), New Zealand socialite and art collector 
 Francis Elgar (1845–1909), naval architect
 Rebecca Elgar, English children's book illustrator and writer
 Sybil Elgar (1914–2007), British educator

Given name
 Elgar Fleisch (born 1968), Austrian/Swiss academic
 Elgar Howarth (born 1935), English conductor and composer
 Elgar Watts (born 1985), South African rugby union player

Other uses
 Edward Elgar Publishing, global publisher of academic works
 Elgar (film), a 1962 drama documentary
 Elgar Technology College, a defunct school in Worcester, Worcestershire, England
 Elgar Uplands, Alexander Island, Antarctica
 Elgar, a villain in Power Rangers: Turbo
 Elgar, a 2020 album by British cellist Sheku Kanneh-Mason

See also
 Elger (disambiguation)
 Ælfgar, Earl of Mercia

Masculine given names